Elisabeth Fischer Targ (August 4, 1961 – July 13, 2002) was an American psychiatrist specializing in psychic phenomena and the role of spirituality in health and healing. Targ produced a series of papers investigating the effects of prayer on AIDS patients, attempting to test the theory with a high degree of experimental rigor, with questionable results that eventually were not confirmed by a study published after her death. She died of glioblastoma, the same cancer she was studying, on July 13, 2002.

Early life
Elisabeth Targ was born in New York City on August 4, 1961, daughter of Russell and Joan Targ, granddaughter to William Targ, and niece to chess world champion Bobby Fischer. In Pawn Sacrifice, a 2014 biopic of Fischer, Targ appears briefly as a child, portrayed by Alexandra Van Loon.

Targ skipped two grades before completing public school, graduating from Palo Alto High School at the age of fifteen and earning her undergraduate degree and her medical degree at Stanford University.  Targ inherited from her father, an active researcher in CIA-sponsored remote viewing experiments, an interest in parapsychology.  

Targ participated in many games and experiments, primarily relating to remote viewing and precognition, while growing up - guessing what her birthday and Christmas presents were before opening them, as well as the outcomes of horse races and presidential elections.

Research on healing prayer
Targ is probably best known for a 1998 study that claimed prayer improved outcomes for AIDS patients. A follow-up to a 1995 pilot study of twenty case control study patients with advanced AIDS, the study was highlighted as a powerful proof of the effectiveness of prayer due to a significant difference between the control and prayer groups, as well as the rigorous methodology used - employing randomization, control groups, and when published it was portrayed as a double-blinded trial.  Targ received nearly $1.5M in grant funds from the National Institutes of Health to test the effectiveness of prayer on AIDS and breast cancer patients.

However, in 2002 Wired columnist Po Bronson published an article discussing Targ, and discussing the methods and results of her study.  While the study was running, the "triple cocktail" of antiretroviral drugs and protease inhibitors had a revolutionary effect on the longevity of AIDS patients, including the study's subjects.  As a result, the study was unblinded partway through and the results were dredged for a significant finding.  After finding no significant difference in the scores for mortality rate (the study's original outcome measure), symptoms, quality of life, mood scores (which were actually worse for the groups prayed for) and CD4+ counts, the study's statistician found that there was a significant difference between the groups for hospital stays and doctor visits.  After a suggestion from an outside doctor, the group also collected data on 23 different infections commonly found in AIDS patients, using retrospective review of the patients' charts, results which were also found to be significant.

As a result, Bronson stated that the study could no longer be considered properly blinded, and was actually an example of the Texas sharpshooter fallacy when positive results are published while negative results are ignored.  A peer reviewer of the study stated that had he known of the multiple attempts to find significance, the data would have required different calculations making it much less likely to have a positive result and therefore considered it a pilot study rather than a conclusive proof.

A later study listing Targ as an author was published in 2006, five years after her death. The study featured a much larger group of subjects (150 rather than 40), and concluded that the only difference between groups that received healing prayer and those that did not was that the group receiving prayer were more likely to guess they were the experimental subjects rather than the control group. There was no difference found between longevity, symptoms, or any other clinically meaningful outcome.

Death
She was diagnosed with and ultimately died from one of the diseases whose treatment she had been studying, the malignant brain tumour glioblastoma multiforme. Targ underwent surgery which determined that the grade IV glioblastoma was inoperable. Targ's decline and death were watched with great interest by the community of remote healers she worked with, who prayed for her, often arriving at her house to offer their assistance while she was undergoing treatment. While pursuing psychic healing as well as intermittent radiation treatments, she married Mark Comings. Targ died on July 13, 2002 – weeks short of her 41st birthday and after several unsuccessful attempts to treat the cancer with radiation and surgery.

References

External links
 Obituary at Spiritualhealth.com

1961 births
2002 deaths
People from New York (state)
Stanford University alumni
American people of Russian-Jewish descent
American people of Polish-Jewish descent
American women psychiatrists
American psychiatrists
Parapsychologists
Alternative medicine researchers
Deaths from brain cancer in the United States
Deaths from glioblastoma
20th-century American women
20th-century American people